Spring Park, or Spring Park Natural Area, is a public park in Milwaukie, Oregon, United States. The park opened in 2015 after two decades of planning and construction, and provides access to Elk Rock Island. The boundaries of the park have been disputed with neighbors.

References

External links

 Spring Park, North Clackamas Parks & Recreation District
 Spring Park Natural Area Project, North Clackamas Parks & Recreation District

2015 establishments in Oregon
Milwaukie, Oregon
Protected areas established in 2015